Reasons to Live is the debut full-length album by Hilly Eye and was released by Don Giovanni Records.

Track listing
Way Back When
Jersey City
American Rail
Amnesia
Double Dutch
Animal
Louisville
January
Almanac
Jacob's Ladder

References

Don Giovanni Records albums
2013 debut albums